Vincent A. Fischetti (born 1940) is a world renowned  American microbiologist and immunologist. He is Professor of and Head of the Laboratory of Bacterial Pathogenesis and Immunology at Rockefeller University in New York City. His primary areas of research are bacterial pathogenesis, bacterial genomics, immunology, virology, microbiology, and therapeutics. He was the first scientist to clone and sequence a surface protein on gram-positive bacteria, the M protein from S. pyogenes, and determine its unique coiled-coil structure. He also was the first use phage lysins as a therapeutic and an effective alternative to conventional antibiotics.

Research 
Fischetti became an Assistant Professor at Rockefeller University in 1973, an Associate Professor 1978, and a full Professor in 1990. He later served as the editor-in-chief of scientific journal, Infection and Immunity for 10 years and section editor of the Journal of Immunology for 5 years. In 1989, the journal Science published Fischetti's initial approaches to developing a Streptococcus pyogenes vaccine using an M-protein-based mucosal delivery approach, which he had developed and found effective at preventing non-type-specific streptococcal infections in mice. The Fischetti laboratory was also instrumental in our understanding of how surface proteins are anchored in the gram-positive bacterial cell wall.  His lab identified the LPSTG signal sequence used by the transpeptidase sortase as the anchoring signal. By the late 2000s, he was exploring the impact of phage lysins, a novel form of antimicrobial ammunition, as an alternative to antibiotics, and found it to be a novel solution to target specific antibiotic resistant bacteria. In 2006, Fischetti was developing a lysin-based oral-nasal spray that can be delivered into the noses and mouths of hospital and nursing-home patients to prevent colonization by MRSA staphylococci. Tests on mice infected with MRSA found their survival rate was significantly improved, and human testing began in 2017. He has since accumulated 'near 40 patents' most dealing with methods to prevent bacterial infections. One such patent dealing with lysins to Acinetobacter was licensed by Bioharmony Therapeutics, Inc in 2019. Several other lysin patents were licensed by ContraFect, a biotech company based in Yonkers NY.  ContraFect developed a Staphylococcal lysin that successfully completed FDA phase 1 and phase 2 human clinical trials, the only alternative to antibiotics to achieve these milestones. His postdoctoral students include microbiologist Olaf Schneewind, who identified sortase after leaving the Fischetti lab. Some of Fischetti's popular videos include those dealing with the topic: 'aged eggnog made with raw eggs is safer than drinking it fresh'.

Personal life 
Fischetti grew up in West Hempstead, Long Island, NY, and enrolled at Wagner College on a pre-dental track, before majoring in bacteriology and public health. He graduated in 1962, and received his master's degree in microbiology from Long Island University in 1967 before receiving  a Ph.D. degree with honors (Founders Day Award) in microbiology from New York University School of Medicine in 1970 under Alan Bernheimer. He later conducted postdoctoral research at Rockefeller University with John Zabriskie and Emil Gotschlich working on Streptococcal M protein and at Albert Einstein College of Medicine with Dr. Barry Bloom, working on the isolation of cytokines under a Helen Hay Whitney Foundation fellowship.

Companies Founded 
Fischetti founded several biotech companies based on technology developed in his laboratory.  The first, M6 Pharmaceuticals a David Blech company filed in 1994, developed mucosal anti-infective vaccines, but failed due to funding issues.  It was reincarnated as Siga Technologies in 1995, and has now morphed into a company developing smallpox and monkeypox therapeutics.  The third, Contrafect Corporation, was a biotech started by Robert Nowinski in 2008 on technology that did not fully materialize. ContraFect then licensed the Fischetti laboratory lysin technology in 2009 and is now developing lysin therapeutics as its sole technology.  The fourth, Astoria Biologica, was founded in 2023 with technology from both the Fischetti laboratory and Vartanian laboratory at Weill Cornell Medicine to develop therapeutics to treat and prevent multiple sclerosis.

Trainees 
Trainees (42):
Kevin Jones, Sheenah Mische, Deborah Bessen, Vijay Pancholi, Olaf Schneewind, Anu Vashishtha, Ambrose Cheung, Jasna Raconjac, Donata Medaglini, Ursula Fluckiger,
Yoshi Shimoji, Claudia Rocha, Anne Bouvet, Patricia Fontan, Thomas Broudy, Daniel Nelson, Jutta Loeffler, Raymond Schuch, Sung Lee, Ann Derbis, Mathias Collin,
Pauleen Yoong, Chad Euler, Patricia Ryan, Jonathan Schmitz, Assaf Raz, Mia Pastagia, Anu Daniel, Monica Fazzini, Greg Resch, Daniel Gilmer, Sherry Kan, Roberto Diez,
Rashid Rumah, Rolf Lood, Brian Utter, Uri Sela, Douglas Deutsch, A. Tabata, Ryan Heselpoth, Juliette Wipf, Christopher Cheleuitte-Nieves, Edmondo Campisi

References

External links 
Research Links
 Bibliography: https://www.ncbi.nlm.nih.gov/pubmed?term=Fischetti%20va

 Web Site:  http://www.rockefeller.edu/vaf

American bacteriologists
American immunologists
1940 births
Living people